Scutellidae is a family of fossil sand dollars (flat sea urchins) in the superfamily Scutellidea. All genera except Scaphechinus  are extinct.

Genera
, the World Register of Marine Species recognizes the following seven genera in this family:
 †Allaster Nisiyama, 1968
 †Parascutella Durham, 1953
 †Remondella Durham, 1955
 †Samlandaster Lambert, in Lambert & Thiéry, 1914
 Scaphechinus A. Agassiz, 1864
 †Scutella Lamarck, 1816
 †Scutulum Tournouër, 1869

References

Clypeasteroida
Extant Oligocene first appearances